Elections in Colombia are regulated and controlled by the National Electoral Council which provides information on elections and election results in for the politics of Colombia.

Colombia elects on national level a head of state - the president -  and a legislature. The president is elected for a four-year term by the people. The Congress (Congreso) has two chambers. The House of Representatives (Cámara de Representantes) has 162 members, elected for a four-year term by proportional representation. The Senate of the Republic''' (Senado de la República'') has 102 members, elected for a four-year term by proportional representation.

Colombia used to have a two-party system, in which it could be difficult for third parties to find success. Politicians from the two main parties tended to win elections when not confronted by strong challengers from their own party (in which cases their traditional opponents tend to win). 

Since the implementation of the 1991 constitution however, there has been a proliferation of 3rd parties which have won most recent elections.

Electoral fraud, bribery, and other scandals that occur at both municipal and national levels are part of Colombia's corruption problem.

Schedule

Election

Inauguration

Latest elections

2022 Presidential election

2018 Presidential election

2018 Parliamentary election

House of Representatives

Senate

See also
 Corruption in Colombia
 Electoral calendar
 Electoral system
 Government of Colombia

Notes

References

External links
Adam Carr's Election Archive
Calendario Elecciones 2006 (Registraduría General de la Nación)
Democracia a distancia: Elecciones 2006 (Portalcol.com)
Votebien.com